Chinu (also Romanized as Chīnū) is a village in Zarrin Gol Rural District, in the Central District of Aliabad County, Golestan Province, Iran. At the 2006 census, its population was 85, in 21 families.

References 

Populated places in Aliabad County